In the Epic Cycle, Antinous (also Antinoüs) or Antinoös ( means "opposite in character, resisting"), was the Ithacan son of Eupeithes, best known for his role in Homer's Odyssey.

Mythology 
One of two prominent suitors of Penelope vying for her hand in marriage, the other being Eurymachus, Antinous was presented as a violent, mean-spirited, and over-confident character who wilfully defiles Odysseus' home while the hero is lost at sea. In an attempt to kill Telemachus, the son of Odysseus and Penelope, Antinous sends out a small band of suitors in the strait between Ithaca and rugged Same where there is a rocky isle called Asteris, to intercept the young prince on his journey back to Ithaca from the hall of Menelaus. The plan, however, fails, as Telemachus avoids the trap with help from the goddess Athena.

Antinous is a prime example of disregard for the custom of xenia (guest-friend hospitality); rather than reciprocating food and drink with stories and respect, he and his fellow suitors simply devour Odysseus' livestock. He also shows no respect for the lower-classed citizenry, as is exemplified when he assaults a beggar, who is actually Odysseus in disguise, with a chair, which even the other suitors disapprove of. Antinous is the first of the suitors to be killed. Drinking in the Great Hall, he is slain by an arrow to the throat shot by Odysseus. Eurymachus then tries to blame Antinous for the suitors' wrongs.

In one account, Penelope was seduced by Antinous and was sent away by Ulysses to her father Icarius.

Notes
Homer. Odyssey. Trans. Stanley Lombardo. Canada: Hackett Publishing Company, Inc., 2000. Print.

References 

 Apollodorus, The Library with an English Translation by Sir James George Frazer, F.B.A., F.R.S. in 2 Volumes, Cambridge, MA, Harvard University Press; London, William Heinemann Ltd. 1921. ISBN 0-674-99135-4. Online version at the Perseus Digital Library. Greek text available from the same website.
Homer, The Odyssey with an English Translation by A.T. Murray, PH.D. in two volumes. Cambridge, MA., Harvard University Press; London, William Heinemann, Ltd. 1919. . Online version at the Perseus Digital Library. Greek text available from the same website.

Suitors of Penelope
Characters in the Odyssey
Ithacan characters in Greek mythology